The Hinnamno bent-toed gecko (Cyrtodactylus hinnamnoensis)  is a species of gecko that is endemic to central Laos.

Hinnamno refers to the Hin Namno Conservation Area.

References 

Cyrtodactylus
Reptiles described in 2016